The FIL World Luge Natural Track Championships 1982 took place in Feld am See, Austria.

Men's singles

Women's singles

Men's doubles

Medal table

References
Men's doubles natural track World Champions
Men's singles natural track World Champions
Women's singles natural track World Champions

FIL World Luge Natural Track Championships
1982 in luge
1982 in Austrian sport
Luge in Austria